AerSale, Inc. is a Coral Gables, Florida-based global supplier of aftermarket commercial jet aircraft, engines, Original Equipment Manufacturer (OEM) used serviceable material, maintenance, repair and overhaul (MRO), and aeronautical engineering services to passenger and cargo airlines, government entities, leasing companies, multinational OEMs, and independent MROs.

General information 
Founded in Coral Gables, Florida in 2008, AerSale employs approximately 500 people in 5 countries worldwide.

A private equity firm and the two founders invested US$250 million in equity in January 2010.

In July 2010 AerSale delivered a specially modified Boeing 737-400 aircraft to the National Nuclear Security Administration to fly depleted nuclear waste to disposal sites. It has supplied low-cost used serviceable turbine blades to the Department of Defense for use on the Air Force's KC-135 Stratotanker aircraft, enabling the government to save over US$36 million in one contract alone.

Customers
AerSale's customers include passenger and cargo airlines, government entities, leasing companies, multinational OEMs and independent MROs.

Lines of business
AerSale operates three integrated lines of business: Aircraft & Engine Leasing; Material Sales; and Maintenance, Repair & Overhaul (MRO).

AerSale sells and leases engines and aircraft, both commercial passenger and cargo aircraft, to customers worldwide. It has purchased Boeing 737-300, Boeing 737-400, Boeing 737-500, Boeing 747-400, Boeing 757-200, and Boeing 767-300 passenger and freighter aircraft; Airbus A300-600R, Airbus A310-200, Airbus A320-200, and Airbus A330-300 passenger aircraft; and McDonnell Douglas MD-90 passenger and McDonnell Douglas DC-8-70 series freighter aircraft. These aircraft are powered by a variety of engines, including the CFM International CFM56, General Electric CF6-80C2, International Aero Engines V2500, Pratt & Whitney PW4000 and Rolls-Royce RB211.

The company is an aftermarket seller of OEM used serviceable material. This material comes from aircraft which have been dismantled and their parts recycled and refurbished for commercial use. Recycling of aircraft for their component parts has become a significant source of used serviceable material to the airline industry, as about 12,500 aircraft will reach their end of life over the next 25 years. AerSale is a member of Aircraft Fleet Recycling Association, a not-for-profit industry group whose members maintain an environmentally friendly standard for aircraft recycling.

AerSale's heavy airframe MRO business is performed primarily at its two FAA-approved Certified Repair Stations located at the Roswell International Air Center, Roswell, New Mexico and the Phoenix Goodyear Airport in Phoenix, Arizona. In November 2013, it completed a major maintenance check for NASA on its flying laboratory, a specially modified McDonnell Douglas DC-8-70 series aircraft. In July 2015, AerSale acquired Aero Mechanical Industries, Inc., located in Rio Rancho, New Mexico, to expand its component overhaul services to include aero structures.

Certifications
AerSale holds a number of regulatory and industry certifications. On March 12, 2010 the Aviation Suppliers Association certified AerSale's quality system to meet the requirements of ASA-100 and FAA Advisory Circular 00-56A. On June 14, 2011 AerSale was certified by the Aircraft Fleet Recycling Association for maintaining "best management practices for
disassembly of aircraft, powerplants, and other aerospace materials". On February 24, 2014 it received a U.S. Approval Certificate from the European Aviation Safety Agency ("EASA").

Acquisitions
AerSale's first acquisition came in 2009 when it acquired 44 McDonnell Douglas DC-8-70 series aircraft from a major international logistics company. The McDonnell Douglas DC-8-70 series aircraft is powered by the CFM56/F108 aircraft engine, variants of which power most of the world's airliners.

In May 2010, AerSale acquired the assets of Great Southwest Aviation located at the Roswell International Air Center in Roswell, New Mexico.

In late 2010, AerSale acquired 19 Boeing 747-400 aircraft from Japan Airlines, representing two-thirds of the JAL fleet of 747-400s.

In 2012, AerSale acquired 25 of Saudi Airlines' McDonnell Douglas MD-90 aircraft. All of these aircraft have been dismantled in Roswell and recycled for their engines and component parts.

In July 2015 AerSale acquired Aero Mechanical Industries, Inc. (AMI), located in Rio Rancho, New Mexico, to expand its component overhaul services to include aero structures. AMI is a global provider of maintenance, repair and overhaul (MRO) of both metallic and composite airframe components and accessories including nacelles, inlet cowls, thrust reversers, and primary/secondary flight controls. In 2018 AMI was rebranded AerSale Component Solutions.

In November 2018, AerSale acquired Avborne, located in Miami, Florida, further expanding its component MRO platform to include overhaul capability for hydraulic, pneumatic, electrical, landing gear and other aircraft components.

In June 2019, AerSale acquired airframe parts specialist Qwest Air Parts, Inc. to add scale to its offering of airframe used serviceable material (USM).

In December 2019, AerSale announces a business combination to be completed in 2020.

References

Aircraft engineering companies
Aerospace companies of the United States
Manufacturing companies established in 2008
Manufacturing companies based in Florida
Companies based in Coral Gables, Florida
Defense companies of the United States
American companies established in 2008
2010 mergers and acquisitions